Caura may refer to:

Caura (insect), a genus of insect in the subfamily Pentatominae
Caura, Trinidad and Tobago, a town in Trinidad and Tobago
Caura antbird, a bird from South America
Caura National Park, Venezuela
Caura River (disambiguation), various rivers